Kraniche des Ibycus")  is a ballad by Friedrich Schiller, written in 1797, the year of his friendly ballad competition with Goethe. It is set in the 6th century BC and based on the murder of Ibycus.

External links

Poetry by Friedrich Schiller
1797 poems
Ballads